Neckarsulm is a city in northern Baden-Württemberg, Germany, near Heilbronn, and part of the district of Heilbronn. , Neckarsulm had 26,800 inhabitants. The name Neckarsulm derives from the city's location where the Neckar and Sulm rivers meet.

Neckarsulm is known for its renewable energy projects and wine. The Weingärtnergenossenschaft Neckarsulm-Gundelsheim (winegrower's cooperative of Neckarsulm and Gundelsheim) is the oldest winegrower's collective in Germany. The wine Trollinger and Lemberger are the principal varieties of grape grown in this region. The Schwarz Gruppe (Schwarz Group) who leads both companies Lidl and Kaufland has its headquarter in Neckarsulm.

Neckarsulm was first mentioned in a document in 771 and was granted city status around 1300. The city celebrated its 1250th birthday in 2021.

Geography 
Neckarsulm is located on the eastern side of the Neckar River Valley. Neckarsulm is to Heilbronn the closest city and the sixth largest city in the federal state Baden-Württemberg.

The urban area of Neckarsulm consists of the city itself and the districts of Amorbach, Dahenfeld, and Obereisesheim.

History 
Archaeological finds such as vessel shards indicate human activity in the greater Neckarsulm region as early as the middle of the 6th millennium B.C. (Neolithic period). In 2001, archaeologists found a Late Bronze Age burial ground in Trendpark-Süd (roughly on the modern day site of the German IT company "Bechtle"), which was dated to around 1100 BC on the basis of metal and ceramic finds. Graves found south of the old city wall indicate a Frankish settlement dating to the 7th century AD.

The town, formerly called "Sulmana" or "Sulmgau", is dated to the year 771 in a deed of donation to Lorsch Abbey. Sulmana is mentioned in the Lorsch Codex. The area became known as Neckarsulm in the 16th century.

Notable landmarks
 German Two-Wheeler and NSU Museum - a museum dedicated to two-wheeled vehicles including riding cars and motorcycles produced in Germany. The museum is housed in the Teutonic Order Castle Neckarsulm. 
 Stadtmuseum Neckarsulm - City museum of Neckarsulm which tells the history of the city from medieval times to present days. The year of the construction of museum's house dates to 1545.
Neckarsulm TDS Office Tower
Obereisesheim transmitter
 Remnants of the medieval city wall along the rives.

Mayors and Lord Mayors
 1845–1865: Franz Josef Alexander Heinrich Becker
 1865–1878: Josef Pecoroni
 1878–1885: Johann Nepomuk Kirner
 1885–1911: Bernhard Rettenmeier
 1911–1913: Heinrich Soller
 1913–1941: Johannes Häußler
 1942–1945: Oskar Volk
 1945–1946: Hermann Greiner
 1946–1949: Johannes Häußler (1879–1949)
 1949–1955: Erwin Wörner
 1955–1967: Hans Hoffmann (1915–2005)
 1967–1992: Erhard Klotz (born 1938)
 1992–2008: Volker Blust
 2008–2016: Joachim Scholz 
 since 2016: Steffen Hertwig

Population
The numbers are estimates, census results (¹) or data from statistical offices.

¹ Census results

² The population increase between 1950 and 1961 comes from the new district Neckarsulm-Amorbach. In 1955, around 3,000 people lived in this place.

Economy
Schwarz Gruppe, owner of Lidl and Kaufland — the largest European food chain — has its headquarters in Neckarsulm.

The city was home of car manufacturer NSU which was taken over by Volkswagen in 1969 and fused with Auto Union to create Audi. The former NSU plant is the smaller of Audi's two principal assembly plants in Germany and manufactures the company's larger, high-end models such as the Audi A6, A7, A8. Audi's performance subsidiary Audi Sport GmbH which produces the R8 is also placed here. NSU denotes Neckarsulm.

Other well-known companies based in Neckarsulm are Fujitsu TDS, Bechtle AG and Rheinmetall Automotive AG.

Notable people

Honorary citizens of Neckarsulm 

 1894: Franz Joseph Maucher (1826–1910), was a chaplain and parish priest in Neckarsulm for 35 years.
 1911: Gottlob Banzhaf (1858–1930), was Kommerzienrat and after the death of his brother Christian Schmidt first director the Neckarsulmer Strickmaschinenfabrik AG from 1884 to 1910.
 1930: Ernst Josef Bauer (died 1881), was a teacher and successful author of the local play "Peter Heinrich Merkle, the Löwenwirt of Neckarsulm".
 1933: Christian Mergenthaler (1884–1980), NSDAP politician, Prime Minister of Württemberg from 1933 to 1945. On 27 July 1933, Neckarsulm granted him honorary citizenship which had been revoked on 28 August 1945.
 1949: Johannes Häußler (1879–1949), was mayor of Neckarsulm for 30 years.
 2004: Kurt Bauer (born 1934), was city council for 36 years, deputy mayor, SPD parliamentary leader and chairman of the SPD local association.
 2008: Volker Blust (born 1944), was head of the city's main and personnel office and was elected in 1992 as mayor of Neckarsulm.

Born in Neckarsulm
 Franz Simon Molitor (1766–1848), in Vienna, musician

 August Herold (1902–1973), by Neckarsulm; vine growers

Other people connected to the city

 Wilhelm Ganzhorn (1818–1880), was a senior judge for Neckarsulm 1859–1878. Ganzhorn was a poet, and was known as the author of the text for the song "In the loveliest meadow" (Im schönsten Wiesengrunde).

 Albert Roder (1896–1970), was an engineer who became known for the construction of motorcycles. He was from 1946 to 1961 chief designer at NSU.
 Klaus Zwickel (born 1939), German unions functionary and former Chairman of IG Metall. From 1968 to 1983 he was first secretary of the IG-Metall Headquarter Neckarsulm.
 Verena Stenke (born 1981), German artist
 Dominik Britsch (born 1987), German boxer

Subsidiary cities

Gallery

References

External links

 Neckarsulm 

 
Audi
Populated places on the Neckar basin
Populated riverside places in Germany
NSU Motorenwerke